HMS Proteus was a Parthian-class submarine designed and built by Vickers Shipbuilding and Engineering in Barrow-in-Furness for the Royal Navy. She was laid down on 18 July 1928, launched on 22 August 1929 and completed on 17 June 1930. Like other submarines in her class she served on the China Station before the war. In the Second World War, mainly based at Alexandria in the Mediterranean, Proteus sank 15 enemy vessels and damaged several others during her service.

Wartime service
In July 1939, Proteus began a refit at Singapore Naval Base. After trials, she arrived in Hong Kong in January 1940 where she carried out her first war patrol, before being ordered to the Mediterranean on 2 April, arriving in Alexandria on 3 May. On 4 July 1940 in the aftermath of the British attack on Mers-el-Kébir, Proteus torpedoed and sank the Vichy , An Admiralty order that French ships were not to be attacked except in self-defence was not received by Proteus until the following day. On 9 August, Proteus was damaged in collision with an Admiralty tug at Malta; local repairs allowed her to complete patrols in the Straights of Messina and the coasts of Calabria and Libya, but in November she was ordered back to Britain for a refit at Portsmouth Naval Base which lasted until July 1941. After trials, Proteus went to Holy Loch where she was fitted with radar equipment, followed by a period of training, trials and exercises.

In September 1941, Proteus returned to the Mediterranean, operating from Malta in patrols off Greece, before mechanical problems forced a move to Alexandria for repairs. Returning to active patrols in late October, her sinking of the troop transport ship Ithaka on 10 November is thought to be the first radar guided submarine attack. In the early hours of 8 February 1942 off the Greek island of Lefkada, Proteus sighted a dark shape astern, thought initially to be an enemy submarine. Turning towards the ship, Proteus narrowly avoided being rammed, but her extended hydroplane caused a large gash in the torpedo boat's bow plating.

After a total of fourteen war patrols in the Mediterranean, the last cut short by engine problems, Proteus was ordered to return to Britain in September 1942. After a lengthy refit at Devonport Naval Base which completed in May 1943, she was assigned to training duties, mainly in the River Clyde area, which continued until she was decommissioned on 30 June 1944. 
  
HMS Proteus was the longest surviving Parthian-class submarine and the only Parthian class submarine to survive the war. Proteus had a total of nine commanders during the war.

References

Bibliography

External links

 IWM Interview with Philip Francis, who commanded HMS Proteus in 1942
 Information on Proteus
 Information on the Parthian Submarine class. Includes Information on Proteus

 

Parthian-class submarines
Ships built in Barrow-in-Furness
1929 ships